The 1988 United States Senate election in Maine was held on November 8, 1988. Incumbent Democratic U.S. Senator George J. Mitchell won re-election to a second full term in a landslide. As of 2022, this is the last time the Democrats won a U.S. Senate election in Maine.

General election

Candidates 
 George J. Mitchell (D), incumbent U.S. Senator since 1980
 Jasper Wyman (R), leader of Maine Christian Civic League and businessman

Results

See also 
 1988 United States Senate elections

Notes

References 

Maine
1988
1988 Maine elections